The Platinum Rule may refer to:

 A variation of the Golden Rule
 The Platinum Rule (How I Met Your Mother), an episode of the TV show How I Met Your Mother